The  Haskell Manufacturing Company  was a manufacturing company located at 801 N. Rowe Street, in a building about a mile north of downtown Ludington, Michigan. Their main product was haskelite, a plywood made from a waterproof glue developed by Henry L. Haskell in the early 1900s. The plywood was veneer wood panels of different thicknesses and was used to make novelty items, furniture, and paneling for construction. The thinner plywood was molded into shapes for body parts of airplanes and transportation vehicles. It was manufactured with different styles and types to fit particular needs.

The company made airplane body parts for military aircraft used in World War I. The manufacturing firm had several subsidiary companies, factories, and offices that were related and supported them. The company was eventually sold off in parts in the mid-20th century. The building where the company was located in Ludington has since been converted to affordable housing.

History 
Henry L. Haskell devised a way to make waterproof glue in 1913 from a derivative of dried cow blood. He used this adhesive to put together cross-grained thin veneer layers of wood to create a product referred to as a flat sheet "panel" – now known as plywood ("plies" of wood). The plywood was named Haskelite after himself. In 1915, he innovated a method to mold this plywood into three-dimensional shapes using heat, hydraulic pressure and his patented waterproof glue.

Haskell created the Haskell Manufacturing Company in 1916 in Ludington, Michigan. The Haskelite plywood was first manufactured there. The thinner three-layered plywood pieces could be molded into any shape desired. It was used for various vehicles including airplanes and flying boats. The plywood constructed canoes, boats, trucks, buses, automobiles, and airplanes. The first plane made with moldable plywood was constructed with Haskelite. It was the Curtiss two-place fighter Whistling Bill. Sea sleds and hydro-airplane pontoons were made of haskelite. The thickness varied by the number of layers requested. Other uses for the plywood were door panels, roofing, flooring, portable houses, bread boxes, grain chutes, drain boards, toboggans, barrels, shipping containers, refrigerators, and canoes.

Haskell in 1917 sold his controlling interest to Bonbright and Company, a group of investment bankers from Detroit and New York City. The company then employed one hundred and eighty men and made ten thousand square feet of plywood per day. They changed the main focus of the company at the beginning of World War I to build military airplane body parts. The Ludington-based plant erected a million dollar expansion to its facilities and increased its employment considerably.

The company in 1918 opened its second plant in Grand Rapids, Michigan. This factory was called the Haskelite Manufacturing Corporation. Its main purpose was to supply plywood for the United States and its allies for the construction of military vehicles and aircraft. This factory was twice as large as the original Ludington plant. It employed a thousand men and produced one hundred thousand square feet of plywood per day. Between the two factories, there were millions of feet of plywood produced during World War I. The manufacturing plant in Ludington was part of the larger Haskelite Manufacturing Corporation that was headquartered in Chicago.

After the war military aircraft were no longer needed and so this use was discontinued and other uses were found for the plywood. One item the firm built was wooden boats because of the waterproof characteristics of the plywood. Its main product was the Haskell canoe, which was molded from one piece of 3/16th's inch plywood.

In the Grand Rapids factory, "Plymetl" was made as one of several specialty plywood products. It was a wooden plywood faced on one side or both with metal (steel or aluminum). One use for this metal-plywood material was for climate controlled facilities (i.e. fur storage, food storage). Another use was for public restroom facilities.
One more type of plywood that the company made was "Phemoloid". This finished plywood planking was used in houses, commercial facilities, railroad cars, trucks, airplanes, and luxury automobiles.

The Grand Rapids factory plant made a deal in 1939 with Fairchild Engine and Airplane Corporation and the industrialist Howard Hughes to manufacture low-priced airplanes. The manufacturing companies used a special process of heat and pressure to fuse together wood fibers and synthetic resins to make a plywood product for the construction of planes. It was the state-of-the-art in making airplanes and more economical than the currently used method of plane construction. The Haskell company and Fairchild had already developed techniques of molding fuselages and aircraft wings to put together airplanes.

Haskell Manufacturing Company had many subsidiaries. One was Marquette Veneer, which made birch Haskelite doors; another company associated was Gillett Log, a Wisconsin company subsidiary that produced the birch wood for door panels. Due to competition the spin-off plant of Haskelite Manufacturing Corporation in Grand Rapids was sold to an industrial buyer in 1949. The Haskell Company agreed to sell its other assets to Evans Products Company of Plymouth, Michigan at the end of 1956.

References

Sources 

 

Buildings and structures in Mason County, Michigan
Economy of Michigan
History of Michigan
1917 establishments in Michigan
National Register of Historic Places in Mason County, Michigan